Maverik Lacrosse is a manufacturer of lacrosse equipment and apparel, based in New York City. The company was founded by professional lacrosse players John Gagliardi and Jay Jalbert in 2005.

Maverik Lacrosse was acquired on June 3, 2010 by Private Equity group Kohlberg & Co. for an undisclosed sum.

Partnership 
In 2020, Maverik teamed up with the US Lacrosse and the National Teams Program to offer gear to athletes. The company has also joined up with the University of Maryland, College Park men's lacrosse team.

References

Clothing companies established in 2005
Sporting goods brands
Sportswear brands
Clothing companies of the United States
Manufacturer
Sporting goods manufacturers of the United States
Companies based in Nassau County, New York